The 1995 Philippine general election were held on May 8, 1995. Filipinos protected the ballot boxes with their lives and campaigned against traditional politicians who used bribery, flying voters, violence, election rigging, stealing of ballot boxes, etc. The Philippine National Police (PNP) listed five people dead and more than 200 hotspots before and 300 hotspots during the election.

Major senatorial candidates 

Note: Party affiliation based on Certificate of Candidacy.

Results

Senate

House of Representatives

See also 
 Commission on Elections
 Politics of the Philippines
 Philippine elections
 10th Congress of the Philippines

References

External links 
 Official website of the Commission on Elections

1995
1995 elections in the Philippines